John Fa'aususa Clarke (born 31 May 1975 in Lower Hutt) is a New Zealand-born Samoan rugby union player. He played as a scrum-half.

Career
His first international cap was against Tonga, at Apia, on 28 June 1997. He was part of the 1999 Rugby World Cup roster, where he only played against Japan, at Wrexham.

External links

F. John Clarke at New Zealand Rugby History

1975 births
Living people
Rugby union players from Lower Hutt
Samoan rugby union players
Samoan people of New Zealand descent
New Zealand sportspeople of Samoan descent
Rugby union scrum-halves
Samoa international rugby union players